The Focke-Wulf Strahlrohrjager was a German swept wing, ramjet-powered interceptor aircraft proposal during World War II. The project was proposed at the same time as the Focke-Wulf Super Lorin and remained only a design study until the surrender of Nazi Germany.

Development
Power for the Strahlrohrjager was to be provided by a Walter HWK 509 rocket engine for takeoff, and two Pabst ramjets. The rocket would provide enough initial velocity to start the ramjet engines which cannot produce thrust at zero or low airspeed. The ramjets were located on the tips of the sharply swept tailplanes and would be used for cruising. The wings were mounted low in the fuselage and swept at 45°. Armament was to have been two 30 mm (1.18 in) MK 108 cannon.

Although referred to as Ta 283 in many publications, there is no evidence that the Strahlrohrjager was allocated an RLM designation, and "Ta 283" is a postwar invention derived from the drawing number Nr. 283 for the Strahlrohrjager.

See also

References

External links

Ta 283
Abandoned military aircraft projects of Germany
Aircraft with auxiliary rocket engines
Ramjet-powered aircraft
World War II fighter aircraft of Germany
Twinjets
Low-wing aircraft